EnterFear (stylized in all caps) is the twenty-second studio album by American rapper Tech N9ne.

Background
It was released on April 17, 2020 via Strange Music. Production was handled mostly by Michael "Seven" Summers. It features guest appearances from Krizz Kaliko, King Iso, Landxn Fyre, Flatbush Zombies, Jehry Robinson, Lex Bratcher, Love Mae C, Mackenzie Nicole, Marley Young, Merkules, Navé Monjo and Scru Face Jean. The album's name is a sensational spelling of "interfere".

The full-length was preceded by two extended plays: EnterFear Level 1, which was released on November 22, 2019, and EnterFear Level 2, which was released on January 17, 2020. Songs "Yeah No", "Feel So Sad", "Angel Baby", "On the Outside" and "B.I.B." were included in the first EP, and the second one was composed of "Outdone", "Leave It On the Flo", "Phonk (Leave It On the Flo, Pt. 2)" and "Smell Good". On August 14, 2020, the third EP, More Fear, was released and consists of seven previously unreleased tracks.

Track listing

Charts

References

2020 albums
Tech N9ne albums
Strange Music albums
Albums produced by Seven (record producer)